The Sullivan-Kinney House, at 441 S. Garfield Ave. in Pocatello, Idaho, was built in 1894 in Second Empire style. It was listed on the National Register of Historic Places in 1977.

References

National Register of Historic Places in Bannock County, Idaho
Second Empire architecture in Idaho
Houses completed in 1894